Yerupalem or Yerrupalem or Errupalem is  a mandal in Khammam district, Telangana, India.

References

Mandals in Khammam district